King's Evangelical Divinity School (formerly the Midlands Bible College and Midlands Bible College and Divinity School) is a nondenominational Christian Bible college based in Broadstairs, Kent in England. The college provides studies by open and distance learning in partnership with the University of Chester, and specialises in hermeneutics (biblical interpretation).

History 

The School was founded in 1990, by Revd Christopher B. Smith. Initially the focus was on classroom-based teaching at the college premises in Wolverhampton, near Birmingham, England, but has since shifted to focus entirely upon e-learning. In 2008 the name of the college was changed from Midlands Bible College and Divinity School to reflect its seminary-level studies and a Master of Arts programme in Theology.

Publications

As a distance learning provider, the school produces a large number of books and audio lectures. Further, the college publishes a journal Evangelical Review of Society and Politics.

See also

Hermeneutics
Biblical exegesis

References

External links

King's Evangelical Divinity School blog
Dr. Stephen Vantassel
Rev. Jacob Prasch

Evangelical seminaries and theological colleges in the United Kingdom
Educational institutions established in 1990
Bible colleges, seminaries and theological colleges in England
University of Chester
1990 establishments in England